Ivy is a 1947 American crime film directed by Sam Wood and written by Charles Bennett, based on the 1927 novel The Story of Ivy by Marie Adelaide Belloc Lowndes.  The drama features Joan Fontaine, Patric Knowles, Herbert Marshall and Richard Ney. The film was entered into the 1947 Cannes Film Festival.

The song "Ivy," written to promote the film by Hoagy Carmichael but not included in the soundtrack, has become a jazz standard. The film was later adapted in 1951 for the radio version of the NBC drama anthology show Screen Directors' Playhouse, with George Marshall directing in place of Wood, who had died two years after the film's completion in 1949, and Fontaine reprising the title role as Ivy Lexton.

Plot
In Edwardian England, Ivy Lexton (Joan Fontaine) is a woman with a taste for the finer things in life. Despairing of her husband Jervis's (Richard Ney), poor prospects,  Ivy sees an opportunity in wealthy Miles Rushworth (Herbert Marshall), and is determined to have him, despite being married and having the additional obstacle of her affair with the infatuated Dr. Roger Gretorex (Patric Knowles).

However, because she is already married, Miles shows no interest in her. In response, Ivy tries unsuccessfully to persuade her husband to divorce her, then plans to poison him and pin the blame on Roger, clearing the way for a relationship with Miles. Inspector Orpington (Cedric Hardwicke) is called in to investigate Jervis' mysterious death.

Cast
 Joan Fontaine as Ivy Lexton
 Patric Knowles as Roger Gretorex
 Herbert Marshall as Miles Rushworth
 Richard Ney as Jervis Lexton
 Cedric Hardwicke as Inspector Orpington
 Lucile Watson as Mrs. Gretorex
 Sara Allgood as Martha Huntley
 Henry Stephenson as Judge
 Rosalind Ivan as Emily
 Lillian Fontaine as Lady Flora
 Molly Lamont as Bella Crail
 Una O'Connor as Mrs. Thrawn
 Isobel Elsom as Miss Chattle
 Alan Napier as Sir Jonathan Wright
 Paul Cavanagh as Doctor Berwick
 Lumsden Hare as Doctor Lanchester
 Norma Varden as Joan Rodney  
 C. Montague Shaw as Stevens

Critical reception
The staff of Variety magazine said of the film, "William Cameron Menzies' production has an off-the-beaten path design that helps generate the melodramatic mood desired. Sets are small and players and settings are lensed from close range. Cast performances are good, but reflect directorial obviousness."

Box Office
The film lost money for Universal.

References

External links
 
 
 

1947 films
1947 crime films
Adultery in films
American black-and-white films
American crime films
Film noir
Films based on British novels
Films based on works by Marie Adelaide Belloc Lowndes
Films directed by Sam Wood
Universal Pictures films
Films scored by Daniele Amfitheatrof
Films set in the 1900s
Films set in London
American historical films
1940s historical films
1940s English-language films
1940s American films